The following elections occurred in the year 1886.

South America
 1886 Argentine presidential election
 1886 Chilean presidential election

North America

Canada
 1886 British Columbia general election
 1886 Manitoba general election
 1886 New Brunswick general election
 1886 Nova Scotia general election
 1886 Ontario general election
 1886 Prince Edward Island general election
 1886 Quebec general election

United States
 United States House of Representatives elections in California, 1886
 1886 New York state election
 United States House of Representatives elections in South Carolina, 1886
 1886 South Carolina gubernatorial election
 1886 United States House of Representatives elections
 1886 and 1887 United States Senate elections

Europe

United Kingdom
 1886 Mid Armagh by-election
 1886 United Kingdom general election
 1886 Sydenham by-election

See also
 :Category:1886 elections

1886
Elections